The following characters are featured in the Disney Junior animated series, Sofia the First.

Main
 Princess Sofia (voiced by Ariel Winter) is a young village girl who became a princess after her mother married King Roland II. She is upbeat, outgoing, adventurous, and loves the outdoors. Ever since she was brought into the royal family, she became the bearer of the mystical Amulet of Avalor, which gave her the ability to understand animal speech (they can understand her without the amulet, with the amulet itself having been the refuge of another princess for 41 years, whom Sofia would eventually release). It can also summon Disney Princesses to help her, with Sofia eventually helping other princesses in need herself as well, in a similar manner. As of Season 4, after defeating the evil Prisma, Sofia has become the first non-magical being to join the ranks of the Protectors, and since then, joined by a Fairy Protector named Chrysta, Sofia is training to become a Protector, obtaining new items to help her like her Enchantlet and her Necessi-Key. But ever since Prisma escaped, and allied herself with Twitch (who stole Sofia's Necessi-Key to help Prisma escape) and, later on, Wormwood (Cedric's former friend and pet raven), it is now up to Sofia (with help from Chrysta, and Sofia's friends and family on occasions) to prevent Prisma from becoming powerful by stopping her, Twitch, and Wormwood from obtaining all of the "Wicked Nine", a group of evil objects that have belonged to nine major Disney villains (The Evil Queen Grimhilde from Snow White and the Seven Dwarfs, Lady Tremaine from Cinderella, Maleficent from Sleeping Beauty, Ursula from The Little Mermaid, Jafar from Aladdin, Shan Yu from Mulan, Dr. Facilier from The Princess and the Frog, Mother Gothel from Tangled, and Mor'du from Brave). At the end of "Forever Royal", Sofia is finally promoted into a full-fleged Protector of the Ever Realm and Storykeeper of the Secret Library. Sofia appears as a teenager in the series finale of Elena of Avalor.
 Princess Amber (voiced by Darcy Rose Byrnes) is Sofia's older stepsister and James' twin sister. She starts out stoic, vain, spoiled, sassy, jealous, and impatient, but nonetheless, throughout the series Sofia helps her become a better person and friend and turns her into an outdoors princess. Honoring her title as princess, she devotes her life to a huge liking of jewelry and keeping everything clean and pristine. Amber soon develops a love of astronomy and going on adventures. She becomes queen of the Island of the Rompkins in The Mystic Isles, and she is named the heir to the throne of Enchancia in "A Royal Wedding" making Princess Amber the "future queen." In the series finale of "Elena of Avalor" Amber appears as a teenager.
 Prince James (voiced by Tyler Merna) is Sofia's older stepbrother and Amber's twin brother, Roland's son and Miranda's stepson. Unlike Amber, he is adventurous, playful and outgoing. He plans to become a knight when he grows up. He is voiced by Tyler Merna and Nicolas Cantu on selected dates. James appears as a teenager in the series finale of "Elena of Avalor."
 Queen Miranda (voiced by Sara Ramirez) – Born Miranda Cordova, she is Sofia's mother, Roland's current wife, and the stepmother of the royal twins. She was a cobbler until she married King Roland.
 King Roland II (voiced by Travis Willingham) Born Roland Winslow, is Sofia's stepfather, Miranda's husband, the father of the royal twins, and the ruler of Enchancia.
 Cedric (voiced by Jess Harnell) is the royal sorcerer of Enchancia with a Cockney accent. He is described as a great and impressive sorcerer by the Good Fairies. He is the son of the previous royal sorcerer Goodwyn the Great who is now retired with Cedric's mother Winnifred the Wise. Cedric has also referred to having a sister who stole from him, who he has never forgiven. His sister's name is later revealed to be Cordelia. In his earlier appearances, he secretly longs to take over the kingdom to bring glory to sorcerers everywhere and prove himself as someone of worth. Ever since Sofia wore the Amulet, he fails repeatedly at stealing it. The one time he managed to, Cedric was cursed by the amulet due to his selfish plans for its use, leaving him unable to use it to take over Enchancia, and found it to be useful only for performing beneficent acts instead to help others. In the episode "Gone with the Wand," it is revealed that Cedric has a niece named Calista who adores him. In "Day of the Sorcerers", Cedric's treachery was finally exposed, and he even admitted that the Royal Family have not once thanked him for his magical services. King Roland gave him a second chance after he was repented of his wrongdoings and helped save Sofia and the kingdom from Grimtrix where King Roland will treat him better than before. After that, during Season 4, Cedric has made amends with Cordelia in "Through the Looking Back Glass", and especially King Roland "In Cedric we Trust", but in the latter episode, Wormwood, his former close friend, has betrayed Cedric in exchange for becoming the newest ally to Sofia's great enemy from the Mystic Isles, Prisma. As of that betrayal, Wormwood has left Cedric to join Prisma and Twitch to claim the "Wicked Nine", to the point where he considers Prisma his "new evil master". After successfully freeing Sofia from the Amulet, King Roland nominates him the title "Cedric the Great".
 Baileywick (voiced by Tim Gunn) is the castle steward. Being a workaholic, he does his job well though he did fall into a few accidents. He can be overprotective of Sofia at times, but she doesn't really mind most of the time. Baileywick also has an older brother named Nigel.                                                                                                               
 Clover (voiced by Wayne Brady) is a rabbit and friend of Sofia with help of the Amulet. He usually thinks of eating constantly, so much so that he often undermines the importance of Sofia's royal duties for the sake of culinary gain, as seen in the episode "The Crown of Blossoms".
 Robin (voiced by Meghan Strange) is a robin and friend of Sofia. She also has a close relationship with fellow avian Mia.
 Mia (voiced by Ashley Eckstein) is a bluebird and friend of Sofia. She also has a close relationship with fellow avian Robin.

Disney Princesses

 Cinderella from Cinderella (voiced by Jennifer Hale) – In the pilot movie Once Upon a Princess, she helps Sofia make amends with Amber and become true sisters. She sings a song called "True Sisters." Jennifer Hale sang the song, due to Tami Tappan, Cinderella's singing voice, being unable to make the recording.
Jasmine from Aladdin (voiced by Linda Larkin, singing voice provided by Lea Salonga) – In "Two to Tangu", she teaches Sofia and Amber how to tame a wild carpet and not to be afraid of trying something new. She sings a song called "The Ride of Our Lives."
 Belle from Beauty and the Beast (voiced by Julie Nathanson) – In "The Amulet and the Anthem", she sings a song called "Make It Right" and helps Sofia realize that actions speak louder than words. Julie Nathanson had to voiced Belle in the Sofia the First Season 1 episode due to Paige O'Hara, Belle's original voice actor, being unable to do the voice recording work.
 Ariel from The Little Mermaid (voiced by Jodi Benson) – In "The Floating Palace", she encourages Sofia to enlist Cora to help rescue her mermaid friend Oona from the sea monster, saying that the love of family is held by all.  She sings a song called "The Love We Share." She is the first Disney Princess not to be shown in her re-design.
Aurora from Sleeping Beauty (voiced by Kate Higgins) – In "Holiday in Enchancia", she teaches Sofia that in a crisis she can always count on her animal friends. She is the first Disney Princess who doesn't sing in the series.
 Snow White from Snow White and the Seven Dwarfs (voiced by Katherine Von Till) – In "The Enchanted Feast", she teaches Sofia to learn the importance of trusting one's instincts after Sofia suspects that a visiting sorceress is not who she says she is. Like Aurora, she is the second Disney Princess who doesn't sing in the series.
 Mulan from Mulan (voiced by Ming-Na Wen, singing voice provided by Lea Salonga) – In "Princesses To The Rescue", she teaches Sofia and her friends that they are stronger than they know. Like Ariel, she is the second Disney Princess not to be shown in her re-design, rather in her armor. She sings the song "Stronger Than You Know."
 Rapunzel from Tangled (voiced by Mandy Moore) – In the second half of the hour-long episode "The Curse of Princess Ivy", she shows how much Sofia and Amber's relationship has grown and deepened despite mistakes that Amber has made. She also teaches Amber to mend their relationship she has to "Dare to Risk It All" to break the curse of Princess Ivy after the curse was unleashed by the Amulet for stealing Sofia's amulet for a selfish want, learning the secrets of the amulet, and betraying Princess Sofia.
 Tiana from The Princess and the Frog (voiced by Anika Noni Rose) – In "Winter's Gift", she teaches Sofia that what matters most when giving a gift to someone is that it comes from the heart. She sings a song called "From the Heart".
 Merida from Brave (voiced by Ruth Connell) – In "The Secret Library", she teaches Sofia confidence so she can save Minimus and Mazzimo and fulfill her task as the storykeeper. She is the 3rd Disney Princess not to be shown in her re-design and third Princess who doesn't sing in the series. Ruth Connell had to voice Merida in the Sofia the First Season 3 episode due to Kelly Macdonald, Merida's original voice actor, being unable to do the voice recording work.

Characters from other Disney properties
Flora, Fauna, and Merryweather from Sleeping Beauty (voiced by Barbara Dirikson, Russi Taylor, and Tress MacNeille) are three good fairies who are the headmistresses of Royal Prep, the school that Sofia, Amber, James, and their royal friends attend.
Olaf from Frozen (voiced by Josh Gad) – In "The Secret Library: Olaf and the Tale of Miss Nettle," Olaf is summoned by the Amulet of Avalor after it is affected by Miss Nettle's Crazy Crystals.
Merlin from The Sword in the Stone (voiced by Jeff Bennett) is a revered wizard who is referenced numerous times in the series, most often by his admirer Cedric. In "Gone with the Wand" he makes his debut after inviting Sofia and two of her friends to visit him at his home. However, Cedric's niece Calista takes Merlin's wand from his tower, allowing it to fall into the possession of his enemy Morgana.
Archimedes from The Sword in the Stone – An owl and a friend of Merlin.

Recurring
 Princess Hildegard (speaking voice by Coco Grayson and singing voice provided by Jenna Lea Rosen) is one of Amber's best friends and the princess of Freezenburg. Hildegard was just as snobbish and vain as Amber was until she forms a close friendship with Sofia in "The Princess Stays in the Picture". She has a pet mink named Lulu.
 Princess Clio (speaking voice by Harley Graham and singing voice provided by Jenna Lea Rosen) is one of Amber's best friends and the princess of Corinthia. Clio is ladylike, yet more soft-sided than Amber and Hildegard. 
 Prince Hugo (voiced by Colin Ford in 2013 and Grayson Hunter in 2014-2015) is a prince who attends Royal Prep. In his first appearance, Hugo started as a bully, making fun of Sofia for failing to ride a flying horse. He also made fun of James for helping Sofia. In the episode from the second season "The Flying Crown" after learning of the true reason for his personality, Sofia reformed Hugo and they became friends. It is revealed in "Lord of the Rink" that Hugo loves ice-dancing, but he was so afraid of his father's reaction that he kept it a secret until Sofia convinced him to trust his heart.
 Prince Axel (voiced by Colin Ford) is Prince Hugo's older brother. Axel appears to be a teenager and has already graduated from Royal Prep. While his joking personality can annoy Hugo and sometimes hurt his feelings, he goes out of his way to show his younger brother that he cares.
 Minimus (voiced by Eric Stonestreet) is Sofia's flying horse.
 Wormwood (voiced by Jim Cummings) is Cedric's pet raven. Just like Cedric, Wormwood is very mean and usually discourages Cedric whenever he fails. Wormwood and Clover are known for having a big rivalry between each other. During Season 3, Wormwood gain the ability to talk with humans, allowing Cedric to understand him. As of "In Cedric we Trust", Wormwood betrayed Cedric due to the fact that the sorcerer is no longer evil and plotting, and that Wormwood misses the "Old Cedric". Feeling betrayed by his once good friend, Cedric fights Wormwood for a crown he stole from the museum. At first, King Roland, witnessing Cedric claiming the crown, thought Cedric wanted the crown for himself, and while everyone was still and speechless, Wormwood claimed the crown back. And to make matters worse for Cedric and especially for Sofia, Wormwood delivered the crown to Sofia's great enemy from the Mystic Isles, Prisma. This is because that crown is really the Evil Queen's crown, one of the "Wicked Nine" that Prisma vows to collect to become powerful. When Sofia (who is the first to learn of Wormwood's plot to deliver the crown to Prisma and join her), along Roland and Cedric (who followed Sofia when they found she was missing while they were returning to the castle) fought Prisma to get the crown back, Prisma proved more formidable with the crown's power and attempted to send Sofia down a fissure. But Cedric managed to save Sofia and he escaped from the fissure, and he and Roland made amends with one another and became close friends once more, with Roland thanking Cedric for saving Sofia and apologizing for accusing Cedric for returning to his old evil ways. Unfortunately for Sofia, Prisma managed to escape with the crown, making the crown the first of the "Wicked Nine" to be in her possession, resulting in Sofia warning Orion, Vega, and the other Protectors that Prisma has obtained one of the "Wicked Nine". And to make matters even more worse for Sofia and Cedric, Wormwood has joined Prisma and Twitch as a result of a deal: Prisma accepts Wormwood as her ally as he gave her the crown as he promised (despite Twitch, following Prisma's orders to spy on Wormwood, secretly trying to interfere with Wormwood's plans and ended up failing).
 Rex (voiced by Jim Cummings) is a foxhound and James' dog.
 Whiskers (voiced by Nick Offerman) is a fox.
 Kai (voiced by Jesse L. Martin) is a giant panda.
 Jade (voiced by Isabella Acres) is one of Sofia's best friends from the village.
 Tyler the Village Boy (voiced by Travis Bryant in the TV series) is one of Sofia's friends from the village and the only village boy to attend Royal Prep Academy
 Ruby (voiced by Fiona Bishop in the pilot movie and Diamond White in the TV series) is one of Sofia's best friends from the village.
 Princess Vivian (voiced by Sabrina Carpenter) is a formerly shy friend of Sofia's who is the music-loving princess of Zumaria.
 Aunt Matilda "Tilly" (voiced by Bonnie Hunt) is King Roland II's sister, the sister-in-law of Queen Miranda, the paternal aunt of James and Amber, and the paternal step-aunt of Sofia.
 Oona (voiced by Kiernan Shipka) is a mermaid from Merroway Cove who Sofia befriends.
 Cora (voiced by Sarah Mitchell) is Oona's older sister who does not trust Sofia at first, but they become friends after working together to save Oona.
 Fluke (voiced by Gabe Eggerling) is a merboy from Merroway Cove, who used to be boastful and jealous until an adventure with Sofia and Oona helped him change for the better.
 Shelly (voiced by Jenna Lea Rosen)
 Flip (voiced by Connor Wise)
 Sven (voiced by John Ross Bowie) is a seahorse and friend of Oona.
 Slim (voiced by Sean Schemmel) is a pufferfish and friend of Fluke.
 Queen Emmaline (voiced by Jodi Benson) – Ruler of the mermaids of Merroway Cove, mother of Cora and Oona.
 Prince Zandar (voiced by Maxim Knight in "Just One of the Princes," Karan Brar in 2013, Cade Sutton in "A Tale of Two Teams," Nathaniel Semsen in "New Genie on the Block") is Prince James' best friend and the prince of Tangu.
 Princess Jun (voiced by Michaela Zee) is a princess from Wei-Ling who is a classmate and friend of Sofia's.
 Princess Kari (voiced by Kiara Muhammad) is a new princess who loves magic and is a friend of Sofia's.
 Princess Zooey (voiced by Fiona Bishop) is a new princess who loves adventures. Zooey is also Amber and Sofia's friend.
 Prince Desmond (voiced by Maxim Knight and Joshua Carlon)
 Miss Nettle (voiced by Megan Mullally and Anna Vocino) is a fairy who was once apprenticed to Flora, Fauna, and Merryweather, but who later sought to surpass her mentors. Like Cedric, she initially covets Sofia's amulet and seeks to obtain it, but is thwarted by Sofia. In "The Secret Library: Olaf and the Tale of Miss Nettle," Miss Nettle's ability at "enchanted horticulture" is revealed to have been the origin for breeding Freezenberg's "snowdrop" royal flower — Miss Nettle never received proper recognition for the "snowdrop" flower, which could be a source for some of her antagonism. Miss Nettle's design appears to have been inspired by concept art from Sleeping Beauty, specifically an unused color scheme for one of the three fairies.
 Rosey (voiced by Pamela Adlon) is a magical talking rose who is Miss Nettle's constant companion.
 Shavanie Jayna as Princess Lakshmi
 Lucinda (voiced by Merit Leighton) is a little witch with magic powers that Sofia befriends.
 Lily (voiced by Brennley Brown)
 Indigo (voiced by Bailey Gambertoglio)
 Marla (voiced by Tracey Ullman and Laraine Newman)
 Calista (voiced by Kaite Zieff)
 Bash (voiced by Brian Cummings)
 Cordelia (voiced by Rachael MacFarlane)
 Morgana (voiced by Catherine le Fay)
 Kazeem (voiced by Connor Wise and Jadon Sand)
 Sergeant Fizz (voiced by Keith Ferguson)
 King Habib and Queen Farnaz (voiced by Sean Schemmel and Nika Futterman)
 Book Narrator (voiced by Hugh Bonneville)
 Prisma (voiced by Megan Hilty) is an evil Crystal Master from the Mystic Isles and sister to Azurine. Ever since Sofia and Amber visited the Mystic Isles, she tried to trick them into thinking that it is her sister who is the evil Crystal Master. Sofia had second thoughts, but Amber, being tricked by Prisma into think that she will give Amber a magical amulet like Sofia, gave her Terra Crystal Staff to Prisma. That's when Prisma's true colors are revealed that she is the evil Crystal Master, not Azurine. Prisma revealed that she had been jealous of Azurine, but now that she has her powers back, she imprisons her sister and plots to cover all of the Mystic Isles in crystals, draining all of the Mystic Isles' residents of their magic in the process. Fortunately, Amber decided to make amends of her mistake, and working together with Sofia, Harumph, and Skye, she used the Shattering Stone to return all of the Mystic Isles and its residents back to normal, free Azurine, and strip Prisma of her powers. Foiled by Sofia and Amber, Prisma tries to run away after Azurine sadly states that she must be turned in to the Protectors, but Sofia, with Skye's help, caught up with Prisma and rescued her from falling off a cliff. But just seconds afterwards, the Protectors arrived in time to arrest Prisma for her crimes against the Mystic Isles. Since then, she has become Sofia's newest enemy and the main antagonist of Season 4. Now angry at Sofia and blaming her for foiling her plans, Prisma has now escaped with the help of her new ally, Twitch (thanks to him giving her Sofia's Necessi-Key). Since then, Prisma vowed revenge on Sofia, and together with Twitch and, later on, Wormwood (Cedric's former close friend and pet raven), Prisma strives to once again become powerful by obtaining all of the "Wicked Nine", the group of evil objects that have belonged to 9 major Disney Villains. In the series finale, "Forever Royal", Prisma succeeded in her plan, only to have more than what she bargained for. As a result, the spirit of the evil enchantress, Vor (freed from the Locket of Vor), possessed Prisma, transforming her into Vor in the process. But after Vor's defeat when she and Sofia were sucked into Sofia's amulet, Prisma apologizes to Sofia for everything that has happened, having never meant for the Ever Realm and Mystic Isles to fall into darkness. Prisma then worried about being imprisoned in the amulet with Sofia, but both were eventually freed thanks to a magic spell by Cedric, and the combined efforts of the Protectors and all of Sofia's friends and family. After being freed from the amulet with Sofia, Prisma has also apologized to the Protectors for everything, and calmly goes along with them and taken into custody. What happens to Prisma after that is still unknown.
 Princess Ivy (voiced by Anna Camp) first appears in the episode "The Curse of Princess Ivy". She appears when Princess Amber steals Princess Sofia's amulet and attempts to summon her own princess. After briefly pretending to be her friend, Princess Ivy, with the help of her black and white butterflies and dragonflies, takes over Enchancia and devoids it of all colors so that it feels more like her former kingdom (where color did not exist save for black, white, and shades of gray). Eventually, the kingdom is recaptured, and Princess Ivy is sent to a prison-type island. She makes her second and final appearance in the episode "Ivy's True Colors". In this episode, all the animals start falling into an eternal sleep ("Deep Sleeps") and the only way to wake them was with a special crop of flowers called "Wake Upsy Daisies" that grew on a faraway island. Meanwhile, Princess Sofia is sent by her amulet to help a princess in distress (her squirrel friend, 'Whatnaught", accidentally gets transported with her). It turns out to be Princess Ivy. It also turns out that the island Princess Ivy was imprisoned (in which she turned "Black and White" to make it feel like home) was on the same island that the special flowers grew on. Since these were colorful flowers in Princess Ivy's now "Black and White" world, Princess Ivy attempts to destroy them with her butterflies. Her pet skunk, "Roma", is not for his mistress's plans and attempts to help Princess Sofia stop Princess Ivy. Princess Sofia learns that Miss Nettle tends the garden and soon, Princess Ivy and Miss Nettle are at odds. The flowers all but get destroyed when both Whatnaught and Roma fall into eternal sleep. Princess Ivy feels "strange" and begins to cry, which was something she had never experienced. Princess Sofia told her she was feeling the Power of Love for her friend, Roma. Princess Ivy soon realized that she did have love within her, and love for Roma. She then turns good and helps Miss Nettle and Sofia, restoring the flowers and using them to awake Whatnaught first ("He was sleeping longer than Roma") then Roma. Upon helping Princess Ivy find her "heart", Princess Sofia's amulet returns her and Whatnaught back to Enchancia where the flowers are used to awake the other animals.  
 Azurine (voiced by Rachael MacFarlane)
 The Locket of Vor (voiced by Paty Lombard) is ominous as it is highly knowledgeable. With Twitch's help, Prisma has obtained the Locket. Upon opening the Locket, it spoke to her about the "Wicked Nine", a group of nine artifacts belonging to nine Disney villains. The Locket revealed to Prisma that if she obtains all of the Wicked Nine, she will become powerful. With the Locket of Vor in her possession, and allied with Twitch and, later on, Wormwood (Cedric's former close friend and pet raven), Prisma escapes (thanks to Twitch stealing Sofia's Necessi-Key and Prisma using it to break out of her prison) and seeks out to claim the "Wicked Nine" to get her revenge on Sofia. However, in the series Finale, "Forever Royal", the Locket of Vor was known to hold an even darker secret.
 Twitch (voiced by Jeff Bennett) is a being known as a Strangeling and ally of Prisma. He has the power to transform into any animal. Twitch is known for the Diamond-Shaped markings that he has on his body. He is the reason how Prisma obtained the Locket of Vor and escaped from her prison, as Twitch stole Sofia's Necessi-Key and gave it to Prisma so she can use it to escape. Later on, as of "In Cedric we Trust", Wormwood, former friend and pet raven to Cedric, joins Prisma, and Twitch has developed a bitter jealousy with the raven ever since they first met.

The Protectors are a group of various magical beings from the Mystic Isles, who protect and serve in a similar manner to regular law enforcement, only most of them have wings and use a highly efficient magical tool known as an Enchantlet. 
 Orion (voiced by Colin Salmon)
 Vega (voiced by Ming-Na Wen)
 Chrysta (voiced by Jurnee Smollett-Bell) is a fairy protector and Sofia's trainer
 Skye (voiced by Andrew Rannells) is a flying unicorn that Sofia and Amber befriend and Sofia's Protector steed of the Mystic isles.
 Nerissa (voiced by Alyssa Rhoney) is a mermaid protector who was sent to find and bring Ursula necklace to the mystic isles 
 Vor (voiced by Paty Lombard) is an ancient, wicked enchantress that was trapped in the Mystic Isles a long time ago who intends to take over the Ever Realm and beyond. She appeared in the series finale, "Forever Royal", where it was revealed that Vor was once defeated by the Protectors and her spirit was imprisoned in the Locker of Vor. That was until Prisma managed to obtain the Locket and used the power of the Wicked Nine to become even more powerful. Sofia and Chrysta attempted to prevent Prisma from using that power, and they seemed to have defeated Prisma by shattering to Locket, but it turns out that Prisma succeeded in her plans. While Orion and Vega told Sofia about Vor, no one realized that Vor's spirit was freed after the Locket was in pieces. It was then that Vor proceeded to possess Prisma, so that Prisma can transform into Vor. With Wormwood and Twitch by her side, Vor proceeded to take over Enchancia, using her powers and spells to eventually take over the kingdom. Sofia and her friends and family (who now know of her Amulet's capabilities) attempted to stop Vor, but she was too powerful at first. But eventually, in a last resort, Sofia used her Amulet in an attempt to trap Vor inside it (just like how Elena sent her inside it years ago until Sofia freed her). However, Vor also trapped Sofia in one of her spells, preventing Sofia from escaping as the two are both sent in the amulet. But during their confrontation, Sofia's love for her friends and family had given her the magic to vanquish Vor once and for all. Vor vanished in a flash of light, and Prisma returned to normal. And thanks to the combined efforts of the Protector's and all of Sofia's friends and family (with Cedric taking the lead by using a magic spell to help Sofia), Sofia and Prisma were freed from the amulet.

References

Disney Television Animation characters
Characters